The list of shipwrecks in July 1820 includes ships sunk, wrecked or otherwise lost during July 1820.

1 July

6 July

7 July

8 July

9 July

10 July

11 July

13 July

15 July

16 July

17 July

18 July

19 July

20 July

21 July

22 July

23 July

25 July

27 July

30 July

31 July

Unknown date

References

1820-07